Alva Edison Ross (3 September 1928 – 7 November 2004) was a Jamaican politician, born at Rock River, St. Mary, Jamaica. He was speaker in the House of Representatives from 1983 to 1989. He died in 2004.

See also
List of speakers of the House of Representatives of Jamaica

References

Speakers of the House of Representatives of Jamaica
2004 deaths
1928 births
Jamaica Labour Party politicians